Alysha Angelica Clark (born July 7, 1987) is an American-Israeli professional basketball player for the Las Vegas Aces of the Women's National Basketball Association (WNBA). She was drafted in the second round of the 2010 WNBA draft by the San Antonio Silver Stars. In 2018, Clark won a championship with the Seattle Storm as they swept the Mystics in the 2018 WNBA Finals, and in 2020 won her second championship as the Storm swept the Las Vegas Aces.  She was also League MVP in 2018 when her team CCC Polkowice (Basketball) of Poland in the Basket Liga Kobiet Basketball won that League's Championship. In 2019, she won a Ligue Féminine de Basketball championship with her French team, Lyon Asvel. She is known for her swarming defense and clutch shooting.

Early life
Clark was born in Denver, Colorado to Jan and Duane Clark, who were both musicians.  She is the younger sister of American Idol contestant Corey Clark. Clark's maternal grandparents were Jews and could speak Hebrew, according to Clark. However, she was baptized as a child and identifies as a Christian.

The family later moved to her hometown of Mount Juliet, Tennessee, where she attended Mt. Juliet High School.

College career
Before Clark attended Middle Tennessee State University, she played two years at Belmont University in Nashville, Tennessee. At Belmont she helped the Lady Bruins to their first ever NCAA tournament appearance in 2007. After two years she transferred to Middle Tennessee. Clark sat out the 2007–08 season, as required by NCAA rules for transfer students. In 2008–09 she averaged a national best and school-record 27.5 points per game. The following year she averaged 28.3 points per game to lead the nation among Division I schools. At Middle Tennessee she earned Sun Belt Player of the Year in 2009 and 2010.

Professional career
Clark was drafted with the 17th overall pick in the second round of the 2010 WNBA Draft by the San Antonio Silver Stars, but did not make a roster that year or in 2011. In 2012, she signed with the Seattle Storm.

In 2018, Clark started every game of the Storm's WNBA Championship run. In Seattle's Western Conference Finals series against the Phoenix Mercury, Clark was the Storm's main choice to guard Diana Taurasi, and in the decisive Game 5, she also logged a double-double with 13 points and a team-high 13 rebounds. In the Storm's championship-clinching win in the WNBA Finals against the Washington Mystics, Clark led the team in playing time, and added 15 points.

In February 2021, Clark signed with the Washington Mystics, but was ruled out of playing during the 2021 WNBA season due to a Lisfranc injury received while playing in France.

In December 2022, Clark signed with the Israeli champions Elitzur Ramla, until the end of the season. She went back to training under Shira Halyon, who trained her in the past in the EuroCup.

Career statistics

WNBA
Source

Regular season

|-
| style="text-align:left;"| 2012
| style="text-align:left;"| Seattle
| 23 || 0 || 10.3 || .547 || .450 || .706 || 2.0 || 0.3 || 0.2 || 0.1 || 0.8 || 3.4
|-
| style="text-align:left;"| 2013
| style="text-align:left;"| Seattle
| 33 || 0 || 15.3 || .453 || .390 || .760 || 2.5 || 0.4 || 0.4 || 0.2 || 1.1 || 4.0
|-
| style="text-align:left;"| 2014
| style="text-align:left;"| Seattle
| style="background:#D3D3D3"|34° || 22 || 16.5 || .448 || .246 || .696 || 2.1 || 0.6 || 0.5 || 0.3 || 0.7 || 4.2
|-
| style="text-align:left;"| 2015
| style="text-align:left;"| Seattle
| 33 || 31 || 23.1 || .544 || .353 || .775 || 3.7 || 1.2 || 0.7 || 0.2 || 1.1 || 6.9
|-
| style="text-align:left;"| 2016
| style="text-align:left;"| Seattle
| 33 || 32 || 27.6 || .484 || .387  || .847 || 3.7 || 1.9 || 0.7 || 0.1 || 1.3 || 9.0
|-
| style="text-align:left;"| 2017
| style="text-align:left;"| Seattle
| 33 || 33 || 28.3 || .525 || .328  || .745 || 4.2 || 1.6 || 0.7 || 0.1 || 1.0 || 8.2
|-
|style="text-align:left;background:#afe6ba;"| 2018†
| style="text-align:left;"| Seattle
| 31 || 30 || 26.2 || .480 || .392  || .846 || 3.5 || 1.9 || 1.0 || 0.1 || 1.2 || 7.4
|-
| style="text-align:left;"| 2019
| style="text-align:left;"| Seattle
| 31 || 30 || 28.4 || .481 || .481 || .818 || 4.7 || 2.5 || 1.1 || 0.5 || 1.5 || 9.6
|-
|style="text-align:left;background:#afe6ba;"| 2020†
| style="text-align:left;"| Seattle
| style="background:#D3D3D3"|22° || style="background:#D3D3D3"|22° || 28.8 || .558 || .522  || .800 || 4.2 || 2.7 || 1.5 || 0.5 || 0.9 || 10.0
|-
| style="text-align:left;"| 2022
| style="text-align:left;"| Washington
| 29 || 29 || 26.4 || .464 || .303 || .913 || 4.5 || 2.0 || 0.9 || 0.3 || 1.3 || 8.0
|-
| style="text-align:left;"| Career
| style="text-align:left;"| 10 years, 2 teams
| 302 || 229 || 23.2 || .496 || .384 || .796 || 3.5 || 1.5 || 0.8 || 0.2 || 1.1 || 7.0

Playoffs

|-
| style="text-align:left;"| 2013
| style="text-align:left;"| Seattle
| 2 || 0 || 18.5 || .455 || .333 || 1.000 || 5.0 || 0.5 || 0.0 || 0.7 || 0.5 || 7.0
|-
| style="text-align:left;"| 2016
| style="text-align:left;"| Seattle
| 1 || 1 || 28.0 || .333 || .000 || 1.000 || 2.0 || 3.0 || 0.0 || 0.0 || 1.0 || 8.0
|-
| style="text-align:left;"| 2017
| style="text-align:left;"| Seattle
| 1 || 1 || 26.0 || .667 || – || 1.000 || 5.0 || 0.0 || 1.0 || 1.0 || 1.0 || 6.0
|-
|style="text-align:left;background:#afe6ba;"| 2018†
| style="text-align:left;"| Seattle
| 8 || 8 || 35.0 || .500 || .458 || .875 || 5.9 || 2.6 || 0.5 || 0.3 || 0.6 || 8.5
|-
| style="text-align:left;"| 2019
| style="text-align:left;"| Seattle
| 2 || 2 || 28.5 || .143 || .200 || .857 || 3.5 || 1.0 || 2.0 || 0.5 || 2.5 || 4.5
|-
|style="text-align:left;background:#afe6ba;"| 2020†
| style="text-align:left;"| Seattle
| 6 || 6 || 30.5 || .453 || .348 || 1.000 || 6.5 || 3.2 || 0.7 || 0.7 || 0.7 || 10.3
|-
| style="text-align:left;"| 2022
| style="text-align:left;"| Washington
| 2 || 2 || 25.5 || .571 || .500 || .667 || 3.5 || 3.0 || 1.5 || 0.5 || 0.5 || 6.0
|-
| style="text-align:left;"| Career
| style="text-align:left;"| 7 years, 2 teams
| 22 || 20 || 30.1 || .457 || .381 || .900 || 5.3 || 2.3 || 0.7 || 0.4 || 0.8 || 8.1

College
Source

See also 
 List of select Jewish basketball players
 List of NCAA Division I women's basketball players with 2,500 points and 1,000 rebounds
 List of NCAA Division I women's basketball career scoring leaders

References

External links
 
 
 

1987 births
Living people
American women's basketball players
All-American college women's basketball players
Basketball players from Denver
Basketball players from Tennessee
Belmont Bruins women's basketball players
Christians from Colorado
Middle Tennessee Blue Raiders women's basketball players
San Antonio Silver Stars draft picks
Seattle Storm players
Small forwards
Washington Mystics players
20th-century American women
21st-century American women
American people of Israeli descent
African-American basketball players